Óscar Javier García Burón (born March 4, 1979 in Bilbao) is a Spanish professional basketball player. He currently plays for Lleida Bàsquet of the Spanish LEB Oro.

Player career 
1999/03  Fairfield Stags
2003/04  Ionikos
2003/04  Aracena Ponts
2004/05  Ourense
2005/06  TAU Cerámica
2006/07  CB Murcia (loan)
2007/10  CB Murcia
2010/11  Lleida Bàsquet

Honours 

TAU Cerámica

Copa del Rey Champion: 1
2006

References

1979 births
Living people
CB Murcia players
Club Ourense Baloncesto players
Fairfield Stags men's basketball players
Liga ACB players
Saski Baskonia players
Spanish expatriate basketball people in the United States
Spanish men's basketball players
Small forwards